Canadian Securities Exchange (CSE), operated by CNSX Inc., is a stock exchange domiciled in Canada. When recognized by the Ontario Securities Commission in 2004, CSE was the first new exchange approved in Ontario in 70 years. The CSE is a rapidly growing stock exchange focused on working with entrepreneurs to access the public capital markets in Canada and internationally.  The Exchange's efficient operating model, advanced technology and low fee structure help companies of all sizes minimize their cost of capital and maximize access to liquidity.

The CSE offers investors access to a broad selection of growth companies through a liquid, reliable and regulated trading platform.  The Exchange is dedicated to entrepreneurship at all levels and has established itself as a leading hub for discourse in the entrepreneurial community.

Designed to meet the needs of emerging public companies and their investors, CSE has experienced rapid growth over the last five years and lists over 700 securities.

In February 2015, the CSE Composite Index was launched as a broad indicator of market activity for the CSE. The CSE Composite Index is a market capitalization weighted benchmark reflecting the performance of CSE listed securities meeting index eligibility requirements.  The Composite Index is uniquely positioned to gauge the Canadian small cap market. Reuters and Bloomberg publish CSE composite index under the ticker CSECOMP. The Index provides a distinctly different risk/return profile compared to the TSX/S&P Composite.  The CSE25 Index is a subset of the CSE Composite Index containing the securities of the twenty-five largest Index companies by market capitalization.

The CSE is located in Toronto, Ontario, and maintains a branch office in Vancouver, British Columbia.

Hours
The exchange's normal trading sessions are from 9:30 a.m. to 4:00 p.m. ET on all days of the week except Saturdays, Sundays, and holidays declared by the Exchange in advance.

Ownership
As at March 31, 2021, Urbana Corporation reported that it holds 49.25% of CNSX Inc. common shares. The remaining shares are widely held and include various funds as well as former and current CSE employees.

See also
System for Electronic Document Analysis and Retrieval (SEDAR)
Montreal Exchange
Nasdaq Canada
Toronto Stock Exchange
TSX Venture Exchange
Winnipeg Commodity Exchange
List of stock exchanges
List of stock exchanges in the Americas
List of stock exchanges in the Commonwealth of Nations

References

External links

Financial services companies established in 2004
Stock exchanges in Canada